Sportfreunde (English: Sport friends) is the name of a number of German sports clubs an may refer to:

Association football
 Sportfreunde Baumberg
 Vereinigte Breslauer Sportfreunde
 Sportfreunde Eisbachtal
 Sportfreunde Köllerbach
 Sportfreunde Lotte
 Sportfreunde Ricklingen
 Sportfreunde 05 Saarbrücken
 Sportfreunde Seligenstadt
 Sportfreunde Siegen
 Sportfreunde Stuttgart

Music
 Sportfreunde Stiller